Ceriana vespiformis is a species of hoverfly. It is a typical wasp mimic, is 10–11 mm long, and has very long antennae for a hoverfly.

Biology
C. vespiformis has been reported in mature oak forest and from Mediterranean scrub, where adults visit flowers to feed on nectar. Larvae are found in white mulberry (Morus alba) sap. Adult are seen in Southern Europe from late May to September.

Distribution
This species' range is mainly Mediterranean (Southern Europe and North Africa). Specimens have been found in Spain, Portugal, France, Italy, Albania, Croatia, Greece, Romania, Turkey, Lebanon, Israel and parts of North Africa. Two specimens have been found in the Netherlands.

References

Eristalinae
Muscomorph flies of Europe
Diptera of Africa
Insects described in 1804
Taxa named by Pierre André Latreille